Vaivoe is a hamlet in the northwestern Whalsay in the parish of Nesting in the Shetland Islands of Scotland. It overlooks the bay of Vai Voe, just to the southeast of Challister Ness and northwest of the Ward of Challister.

References

External links

Photograph
Canmore - Vaivoe, Ogham Inscribed Stone site record

Villages in Whalsay